Journey to the Heart of the World is an animated series that ran from September 6, 1993 to 1994. It was based on the Franco-Belgian comic strip Corentin.

Ownership of the series passed to Disney in 2001 when Disney acquired Fox Kids Worldwide, which also includes Saban Entertainment. The series is not available on Disney+.

Plot 
The series follows the travels of the best sailor in the world Cory Feldoe, who crossed the world far and wide in search of new lands, friends, and experiences. Cory's father was a sailor as well and died of mysterious circumstances. Cory never came to terms with his father's death. He continued in search of him. He decided to end his journey around the world when he found his father.

Cast 
 Malcolm Robinson – Cory Feldoe
 Andrea Bruce – Marie
 Greta Pitush – Sarina
 Gillian Gardner – Mademoiselle Giselle
 Simon Prescott – Captain Touchet
 Dave Mallow – Louis
 Robert Axelrod – Scarface
 Sam Strong – Three-Fingers
 Tom Wyner – Prince Blackstone

Direction, Casting, Supervising Producer
Doug Stone

Episodes

References

External links 

1993 French television series debuts
1994 French television series endings
1990s French animated television series
French children's animated adventure television series
English-language television shows
Television series by Saban Entertainment
Television series based on Belgian comics
Canal+ original programming